On 20 December 2013, at its 68th session, the United Nations General Assembly (UNGA), in its resolution UN 68/205, decided to proclaim 3 March, the international day of the adoption of the Convention on International Trade in Endangered Species of Wild Fauna and Flora (CITES) on the planet raise awareness and benefits fauna and flora in 1973, as World Wildlife Day. The commemoration was proposed by Thailand to celebrate and raise awareness of the world's wild fauna and flora. Thus, for the first time, World Wildlife Day was celebrated in 2014.

UNGA Resolution
In its resolution, the General Assembly reaffirmed the intrinsic value of wildlife and its various contributions, including ecological, genetic, social, economic, scientific, educational, cultural, recreational and aesthetic, to sustainable development and human well-being.

The General Assembly took note of the outcome of the 16th meeting of the Conference of the Parties to CITES, held in Bangkok from 3 to 14 March 2013, in particular Resolution Conf. 16.1 designating 3 March as World Wildlife Day, in order to celebrate and raise awareness of the world’s wild fauna and flora, and recognized the important role of CITES in ensuring that international trade does not threaten the survival of species.

The General Assembly requested the CITES Secretariat, in collaboration with relevant organizations of the United Nations system, to facilitate the implementation of World Wildlife Day.

Themes
2023: "Partnerships for Wildlife Conservation"

2022: "Recovering key species for ecosystem restoration"

2021: "Forests and Livelihoods: sustaining people and planet"

2020: "Sustaining all life on earth"

2019: "Life below water: for people and planet"

2018: "Big cats - predators under threat".

2017: "Listen to the young voices".

2016: "The future of wildlife is in our hands", with a sub-theme "The future of elephants is in our hands".

2015: "It’s time to get serious about wildlife crime".

References

External links
 World Wildlife Day page on UN.org
 Official website of World Wildlife Day
 Official Facebook page of World Wildlife Day
 Official Flickr page of World Wildlife Day
 Under Secretary Novelli Delivers Remarks at a World Wildlife Day Event 2016

United Nations days
March observances